This is a summary of 1930 in music in the United Kingdom.

Events
8 February – Singer Sam Browne makes his first recording with Bert Ambrose's band on Decca.
5 April – 25-year-old Michael Tippett gives a concert at Oxted consisting entirely of his own works—a Concerto in D for flutes, oboe, horns and strings; settings for tenor of poems by Fry; Psalm in C for chorus and orchestra, again with a text by Fry; piano variations on the song "Jockey to the Fair"; and a string quartet.
7 June - The Daily Herald reports that Jack Hylton and his band sold nearly four million records in the previous year.
29 September – Roy Fox gives his first London performance.
22 October – The London-based BBC Symphony Orchestra gives its first concert in Queen's Hall, conducted by Adrian Boult.
date unknown
The Joe Loss Orchestra is established.
Gerald Walcan Bright adopts the name "Geraldo" to further his career as a bandleader. 
Songwriter Fred Godfrey and Irish tenor Tom Finglass form a short-lived variety act.
The Dagenham Girl Pipers are established, under the direction of Rev. Joseph Waddington Graves, the minister of Osborne Hall Congregational church.

Popular music
"By the Sleepy Lagoon", by Eric Coates
"It isnae me", w. Sally Holmes, m. Edward Elgar
"Someday I'll Find You", by Noël Coward
 "The White Dove" w. Clifford Grey m. Franz Lehár

Classical music: new works
Kenneth J. Alford – The Standard of St. George
William Alwyn – Piano Concerto No. 1
Arnold Bax – Winter Legends
Arthur Bliss – Morning Heroes (oratorio)
Edward Elgar – Pomp and Circumstance March No. 5 in C
Gustav Holst – A Choral Fantasia
John Ireland 
Legend for piano and orchestra
Piano Concerto in E flat
Peter Warlock – Carillon Carilla

Film and Incidental music
Ernest Irving – Birds of Prey

Musical theatre
25 June – The Love Race opens at the Gaiety Theatre where it runs for 237 performances.
30 October – Nippy (music by Billy Mayerl; book and lyrics by Arthur Wimperis and Frank Eyton), starring Binnie Hale, opens at the Prince Edward Theatre and runs for 137 performances.

Musical films
 Elstree Calling, starring Teddy Brown
 Harmony Heaven, starring Polly Ward
 Just for a Song, starring Lillian Hall-Davis, Roy Royston and Constance Carpenter.
 The Nipper, starring Betty Balfour

Births
5 January – Saxa, Jamaican-born British saxophonist (died 2017)
17 February – Frank Wappat, singer and radio host (died 2014)
5 March – Isla Cameron, actress and folk singer (died 1980)
10 March – Jimmie Macgregor, folk singer
28 March – Elizabeth Bainbridge, operatic soprano 
17 April – Chris Barber, jazz trombonist (died 2021)
4 May – Bill Eyden, jazz drummer (died 2004)
8 May – Heather Harper, operatic soprano (died 2019)
22 May – Kenny Ball, jazz trumpeter and bandleader (died 2013)
28 May – Julian Slade, composer (died 2006)
30 May – Gordon Langford, composer and arranger (died 2017)
1 June – Edward Woodward, actor and singer (died 2009)
10 July – Josephine Veasey, mezzo-soprano
20 July – Sally Ann Howes, actress and singer
27 July – Andy White, Scottish drummer (died 2015)
1 August – Lionel Bart, composer and lyricist (died 1999)
13 August – Bernard Manning, comedian and singer (died 2007)
12 October – Cyril Tawney, singer-songwriter (died 2005)
1 November – John Scott, conductor and composer
2 November – Peter Hope (also known as William Gardner), composer and arranger
1 December – Matt Monro, singer (died 1985)

Deaths
17 February – Louise Kirkby Lunn, operatic contralto, 56
22 June – Mary Davies, singer, 75
13 November – Thomas Bulch, British-born Australian composer, 67
17 December – Peter Warlock, composer, 36

See also
 1930 in British television
 1930 in the United Kingdom
 List of British films of 1930

References

British Music, 1930 in
Music
British music by year
1930s in British music